The First Margrave War from 1449–50 was the result of disputes between the Free Imperial City of Nuremberg and Albrecht III Achilles, Elector of Brandenburg. Numerous towns in Franconia in modern Germany were badly affected by the war.

On 13 August 1449, Albrecht captured Castle Lichtenau, a possession of Nuremberg. On 11 March 1450, Albrecht was defeated at Pillenreuther Weiher. The war ended with the signing of a peace treaty at Bamberg on 22 June 1450. Albrecht had to return all captured lands to the city of Nuremberg.

See also
 Second Margrave War

References 

1440s in the Holy Roman Empire
1450s in the Holy Roman Empire
1449 in Europe
1450 in Europe
Wars involving the Holy Roman Empire
Nuremberg
Medieval Bavaria
Conflicts in 1449
Conflicts in 1450